Jorge Ortiz Mendoza (born 25 April 1992) is a Spanish professional footballer who plays a forward for China League One club Sichuan Jiuniu.

Club career
Born in Villacañas, Toledo, Castile-La Mancha, Ortiz graduated from Getafe CF's youth system, making his debut as a senior with CD Madridejos in the Tercera División. In summer 2012 he moved to Albacete Balompié, starting out with the reserves also in the fourth tier.

On 18 January 2013, Ortiz signed for CP Villarrobledo of the same league. After featuring sparingly, he joined Internacional de Madrid on 23 August.

Ortiz signed with AD Alcorcón on 21 June 2014, being assigned to the B team still in division four. His first game as a professional with the main squad took place on 24 May 2015, as he came on as a second-half substitute for Facundo Guichón in a 3–0 away loss against Real Betis in the Segunda División.

On 9 July 2015, Ortiz joined Segunda División B club CF Fuenlabrada. Roughly one year later, he returned to the second division after agreeing to a two-year contract at Real Oviedo.

Ortiz spent the next three seasons in the Spanish lower leagues, with Atlético Madrid B, Cultural y Deportiva Leonesa and CD Atlético Baleares. On 6 August 2020, he moved to the Indian Super League with FC Goa on a two-year deal as a free agent. 

During his spell in India, Ortiz appeared in AFC Champions League, scoring in the 1–1 group-stage draw at Al-Rayyan SC on 26 April 2021. On 3 October that year, his team clinched their first ever Durand Cup title after defeating Mohammedan SC 1–0, but he did not take the field in Kolkata.

On 11 April 2022, Ortiz joined China League One club Sichuan Jiuniu FC.

Career statistics

Club

Honours
Goa
Durand Cup: 2021

References

External links
Villarrobledo official profile 

1992 births
Living people
Sportspeople from the Province of Toledo
Spanish footballers
Footballers from Castilla–La Mancha
Association football forwards
Segunda División players
Segunda División B players
Tercera División players
Atlético Albacete players
Internacional de Madrid players
AD Alcorcón B players
AD Alcorcón footballers
CF Fuenlabrada footballers
Real Oviedo players
Atlético Madrid B players
Cultural Leonesa footballers
CD Atlético Baleares footballers
Indian Super League players
FC Goa players
China League One players
Sichuan Jiuniu F.C. players
Spanish expatriate footballers
Expatriate footballers in India
Expatriate footballers in China
Spanish expatriate sportspeople in India
Spanish expatriate sportspeople in China